Carbon Center is an unincorporated community in Vernon County, in the U.S. state of Missouri.

History
A post office called "Carbon Centre" was established in 1874, and remained in operation until 1904. The community was so named on account of local deposits of coal, a carbon-based fuel.

References

Unincorporated communities in Vernon County, Missouri
Unincorporated communities in Missouri